Joslyn is a surname. Notable people with the surname include:

Allyn Joslyn (1901–1981), American stage, film and television actor
Betsy Joslyn (born 1954), Broadway musical and dramatic actress and soprano
Cliff Joslyn (born 1963), American information systems scientist
Frank Joslyn Baum (1883–1958), lawyer, soldier, writer, and film producer
Hezekiah Joslyn (died 1865), American abolitionist
Joslyn Hoyte-Smith (born 1954), former British 400m athlete
Lewis Joslyn, American politician 
Marcellus L. Joslyn (1873–1963), founder of the Joslyn Manufacturing and Supply Company, a Chicago, Illinois electrical supply firm
Matilda Joslyn Gage (1826–1898), suffragist, Native American activist, abolitionist, freethinker, and prolific author
Maynard A. Joslyn (1904–1984), Russian-born American food scientist in the rebirth of the California wine industry after 1933
Patrick Allen Joslyn (born 1986), American drag queen known as Joslyn Fox
Steve Joslyn, American college baseball coach

See also
Joslyn Musey,  protagonist of the novel Warchild

See also
Joslyn Art Museum, the principal fine arts museum in the state of Nebraska, United States of America
Joslyn Castle, folly located at 3902 Davenport Street in the District of Omaha, Nebraska, USA
Jocelyn
Joslin (disambiguation)
Josselin Castle